Lukas Poklepović (16 February 1945 – 12 June 2022) was a Croatian footballer who played as a goalkeeper.

Career
Poklepović joined his first team, HNK Hajduk Split, at the age of 19. After five seasons in the Yugoslav First League, he fled from Yugoslavia to West Germany and played for 1. FC Kaiserslautern before joining the Belgian club Beveren.

With Beveren, Poklepović participated in the 1971 Inter-Cities Fairs Cup. The club reached the round of 16 before being eliminated by Arsenal. Poklepović played all six of his team's fixtures in the competition. In 1972, the club was relegated to the Belgian Second Division, which they won the following year and were promoted. He then decided to return to Yugoslavia with HNK Šibenik, giving way to goalkeeper Jean-Marie Pfaff in Beveren, playing 145 official matches for the club. He then moved to Greece to play for OFI Crete and PAS Giannina before retiring.

Death
Poklepović died in Split on 12 June 2022 at the age of 77.

References

External links
 

1945 births
2022 deaths
People from Brač
Association football goalkeepers
Yugoslav footballers
HNK Hajduk Split players
1. FC Kaiserslautern players
K.S.K. Beveren players
HNK Šibenik players
OFI Crete F.C. players
PAS Giannina F.C. players
Yugoslav First League players
Belgian Pro League players
Challenger Pro League players
Super League Greece players
Yugoslav expatriate footballers
Expatriate footballers in West Germany
Yugoslav expatriate sportspeople in West Germany
Expatriate footballers in Belgium
Yugoslav expatriate sportspeople in Belgium
Expatriate footballers in Greece
Yugoslav expatriate sportspeople in Greece
Burials at Lovrinac Cemetery
Yugoslav defectors